The Andakerebina were an indigenous Australian people of the Northern Territory.

Country
Their land took in the headwaters of the Field River, and the lower Hay River. Tindale suggested their southwestern limits lay approximately in the area of Lake Caroline.

Alternative names
 Antakiripina. (Iliaura exonym)
 Undekerebina
 Andeberegina. (misprint?)
 Walwallie
 Willi-willi
 Yanindo

Notes

Citations

Sources

Aboriginal peoples of the Northern Territory